

Vid or VID may refer to:

In linguistics

 VID, the Sanskrit root of Vidya, meaning "to know" and related to "veda". 
 "vid", Eye dialect spelling of "with"
 Vid (given name), Slavic given name

In mythology

 Vid or Svetovid (Svantovid), a Slavic god that is the origin of various Slavic toponyms
 Víd, one of the Élivágar rivers in Norse mythology

In geography

 Vid (river), a river in Bulgaria also known as Vit
 Vid, Croatia, a small settlement and archeological site near Metković
 Vid, Hungary, a village near Veszprém

In science

 Vienna Institute of Demography, a research institute of the Austrian Academy of Sciences and the Wittgenstein Centre for Demography and Global Human Capital
 VID Specialized University, a higher education and research institution in Norway.

In technology

 Voltage Identification Digital, a digital specification for output voltages
 Logitech Vid, a VoIP service based on SightSpeed
 VLAN Identifier, a data field in IEEE 802.1Q VLAN tagging
 slang for video or videotape

In business

 Grupo Editorial Vid, a publishing group from Mexico
 VID (company), a television company in Russia

Other uses
 Short for "virus disease", referring to viral disease